Jon Hedley Trickett (born 2 July 1950) is a British Labour Party politician who has been the Member of Parliament (MP) for Hemsworth in West Yorkshire since a 1996 by-election. He was Shadow Lord President of the Council from 2016 to 2020 and served as Shadow Minister for the Cabinet Office from 2011 to 2013 and 2017 to 2020. He was the Labour Party National Campaign Coordinator under Jeremy Corbyn from 2015 to 2017.

Trickett served as the Parliamentary Private Secretary to Prime Minister Gordon Brown from 2008 to 2010 and was promoted to the Shadow Cabinet by Ed Miliband in 2011 as Shadow Minister for the Cabinet Office.

Trickett was appointed Shadow Secretary of State for Communities and Local Government under new Party Leader Jeremy Corbyn in September 2015, before serving as Shadow Secretary of State for Business, Innovation and Skills from July to October 2016. He was later appointed Shadow Minister for the Cabinet Office by Corbyn in February 2017, alongside his portfolio as Shadow Lord President of the Council. 

He is a member of the Socialist Campaign Group, a parliamentary group of Labour MPs.

Education and early political career
Trickett studied at Roundhay Grammar School (now called Roundhay School) in Leeds. He received a BA in Politics from the University of Hull, and later an MA in Political Sociology from the University of Leeds.

Formed politically by the anti-Vietnam war movement, he joined the Labour Party in 1969 and was active on the Labour left in Leeds from the late 1960s. From 1974 to 1986 he worked as a builder and plumber. During the campaigns relating to the Common Market referendum in 1975 he was the secretary of the Vote No campaign in Leeds.

During the 1970s Trickett was a member of the ILP (the successor body of the Independent Labour Party), contributed to its newspaper, the Labour Leader, and was elected for a number of years to its ruling body, the National Administrative Council. Trickett was also active in anti-fascist and anti-war movements, and was a delegate to the Leeds Trades Council. Later he was the election agent for Michael McGowan who became the MEP for Leeds in 1984.

Trickett was first elected to Leeds City Council for the Beeston ward in 1984 at the age of 34. He replaced George Mudie as Leader of the Council in 1989, holding the leadership until 1996 and his election to Parliament. Brian Walker replaced Trickett as Council Leader and resigned his council seat after the May local elections.

Parliamentary career

Labour government
Elected on 1 February 1996 in a by-election brought about by the death of the previous MP, Labour's Derek Enright, Trickett was made PPS to Peter Mandelson after Labour was elected to power and worked in the Cabinet office and subsequently the DTI. After leaving the government at the time of Mandelson's fall from grace, Trickett was chair of the Compass pressure group.

He played a significant role in rebelling against the Iraq War and participated in demonstrations against the War in London, Wakefield and Leeds. He rebelled on a number of occasions against Tony Blair's reforms to public services. He led the demands for a recall of Parliament at the time of the Israeli attacks on the Lebanon, and the campaign inside the Commons to amend the Companies Bill to secure public listed companies reporting on 'supply chain issues' in line with the suggestions of a range of non governmental organisations. He was also a leading figure in the campaign to prevent a decision to replace the Trident nuclear weapons system in 2007. In addition, he was Jon Cruddas's campaign manager during the 2007 Labour Party deputy leadership election.

Trickett had previously voted against the Blair Government's 90-day detention proposals in the Terrorism Act 2006, which had been publicly advocated by the police, and was joined by both Labour and Conservative MPs in the vote, the only time Blair was defeated in the Commons. Trickett and Cruddas voted in favour of the subsequent 28-day detention proposal, and Trickett then resigned from his position in Compass after voting in favour of the legislation despite opposition to the Bill from some members of Compass.

Trickett was appointed by the trades unions as acting chair of the board of Tribune in 2007, but gave up this role when the paper was taken over by a private proprietor.

In June 2007 he was asked by Gordon Brown to chair the party's manifesto group on housing, a position which he declined to take up.
Following the cabinet reshuffle of 3 October 2008, Trickett became the Parliamentary Private Secretary to the Prime Minister, Gordon Brown.

In opposition
On 7 October 2011, Trickett was appointed to the Shadow Cabinet as Shadow Minister for the Cabinet Office by Labour Leader Ed Miliband. He was re-elected to the House of Commons at the 2015 general election with a majority of 12,078.

In 2016, a former British National Party candidate was convicted of making an anti-semitic verbal attack upon Trickett.

Trickett was one of 36 Labour MPs to nominate Jeremy Corbyn as a candidate in the Labour leadership election of 2015. On 27 June 2016 Trickett was appointed as Shadow Lord President of the Council and Campaigns and Elections Director. Later that year, Trickett was appointed Shadow Secretary of State for Business, Innovation and Skills.

In July 2016, Trickett apologised for comments on Twitter which appeared to liken an attempted coup in Turkey to attempts to oust Jeremy Corbyn. Trickett deleted the relevant tweet and apologised, saying: "Okay okay. Tweet deleted and withdrawn. Shouldn't tweet when feeling ill. I apologise sincerely".

On 5 April 2020, following the election of Keir Starmer as Leader of the Labour Party, Trickett was asked to stand down from his frontbench roles. He had backed Rebecca Long-Bailey for the party leadership.

Personal life
Trickett married Sarah Balfour on 31 October 1993. They have three children.

References

External links
 Jon Trickett MP official constituency website

|-

|-

|-

|-

|-

|-

|-

|-

1950 births
Living people
Alumni of the University of Hull
Alumni of the University of Leeds
Councillors in Leeds
Labour Party (UK) MPs for English constituencies
People educated at Roundhay School
UK MPs 1992–1997
UK MPs 1997–2001
UK MPs 2001–2005
UK MPs 2005–2010
UK MPs 2010–2015
UK MPs 2015–2017
UK MPs 2017–2019
UK MPs 2019–present
Parliamentary Private Secretaries to the Prime Minister